Parid Cara (born 11 September 1976, in Kavajë) is a businessman and former politician who served as a member of the Assembly of the Republic of Albania representing the Socialist Party.

References

Living people
Parliament members from Kavajë
1976 births
Members of the Parliament of Albania
Socialist Party of Albania politicians
Parid